Beata Moon (born 1969) is a Korean-American classical pianist and composer.

Biography 
Moon was born in North Dakota and raised in Indiana. She made her musical debut at age 8 with the Indianapolis Symphony Orchestra.  Moon trained as a pianist at the Juilliard School with Adele Marcus earning both her bachelor's and master's degrees there. She is self-taught as a composer.

Work 
Moon's compositions are compared to post-minimalist, but defy a strict definition of genre.

She released Perigee & Apogee in 2001 on the Albany label and Earthshine on her own label, Bibimbop Records in 2004. In 2007, Naxos Records added a CD of her works for solo piano, performed by Moon herself, to their catalog of important 21st-century composers. Her work has been acclaimed by  Kyle Gann, Gramophone, Allmusic, and others.

Moon has frequently collaborated with choreographer Henning Rübsam and his company SENSEDANCE. "After Yet Another Fall" (1992), "Dolphins and Antelopes" (1996), "Moonpaths" (1998), "Dinner is West" (2005) and "Tenancy" (2011) are among her commissions for the company. Rübsam choreographed to other works by Moon, including her "In Transit" from 1999 which was used for the choreographer's "Amaranthine Road" (2007).

She also has gained notability for performing a series of "Whodunit?" concerts at such venues as the Kennedy Center, in which the program notes are not provided until the end of the concert.

The Beata Moon Ensemble
The Beata Moon Ensemble debuted on February 22, 2002 at Columbia University's Miller Theatre with Lara St. John as the featured soloist.

Beata Moon, piano
Tara Helen O'Connor, flute
Jacqueline Leclair, oboe
Marianne Gythfeldt, clarinet
Ann Ellsworth, french horn
Laura Koepke, bassoon (adjunct instructor of music at Western Connecticut State University)

Discography

Perigee & Apogee (Jan 1, 2000)
Safari (2000) - performed by Beata Moon/David Fedele/Tom Chiu/Makoto Nakura/Thomas Kolor
Piano Fantasy (1998) - performed by Beata Moon
Moonpaths (1998) - performed by Beata Moon/Alan R. Kay/Karen Marx
Submerged (1999) - performed by Beata Moon
Antelope Vamp (1996) - performed by Beata Moon/Tom Chiu/Makoto Nakura/Thomas Kolor
Winter Sky (1996) - performed by Beata Moon/Chin Kim
In Transit (1999) - performed by Beata Moon
Mary (1996) - performed by Beata Moon/Joan La Barbara/Tom Chiu/Danny Mallon
Prelude (1996) - performed by Beata Moon

Earthshine (Nov 20, 2004)
Movement (2002)
Illusions (2000)
Nursery (1996)
Guernica (2003)
String Quartet: Homage to Béla (2000)
1,2,3 (2002)
Vignettes (2003/04)
3 Songs for My Parents [ 1 Corinthians 13, John 3:16, Psalm 121](1996)
Shall I Compare Thee to a Summer's Day (2000)
Wind Quintet (2004)

Piano Works (Jun 26, 2007)
Piano Sonata (2006)
Submerged (1999)
In Transit (1999)
Guernica (2003)
Inter-Mez-Zo (2006)
Tocatta (2000)
Ode (1998)
Piano Fantasy (1998)
Nursery (1996)
The Secret (2005)
Prelude (1996)

References

Sources
Kourlas, Gia (November 10, 2008). "Good Looks, Classical and Cloudy". The New York Times.
Hsu,Andrea (December 30, 2021). “A Musician in New York”. “NPR”.

External links
official site
SENSEDANCE
WQXR Radio

1969 births
20th-century classical composers
21st-century American composers
21st-century classical composers
American classical pianists
American women classical pianists
American women classical composers
American classical composers
Living people
Musicians from Indianapolis
20th-century American women pianists
20th-century American composers
20th-century American pianists
21st-century American women pianists
21st-century classical pianists
21st-century American pianists
20th-century women composers
21st-century women composers